Elisa Nájera Gualito (born August 16, 1986, in Celaya, Guanajuato) is a Mexican TV host, model and beauty pageant titleholder who was crowned Nuestra Belleza México on October 5, 2007, in Manzanillo, Colima.

Pageants
Nájera competed against 33 other contestants in the national pageant Nuestra Belleza Mexico, which she won.

On July 2, 2008, beating 79 other contestants, Najera won the "Best in Bikini - Queen Of Vinpearl" special award title, which came with a trophy and US$2,000.

During the final competition of Miss Universe, held on July 13, 2008, Najera placed among the top 15 semi-finalists and competed in swimsuit and evening gown rounds before moving on to the final five, finishing as fourth runner-up to the eventual winner, Miss Venezuela, Dayana Mendoza.

References

1986 births
Nuestra Belleza México winners
Miss Universe 2008 contestants
People from Celaya
Mexican people of Italian descent
People of Sicilian descent
Models from Guanajuato
Living people